Csaba Sós (born 20 April 1957) is a retired Hungarian  swimmer who won a bronze medal in the 400 m medley event at the 1977 European Aquatics Championships. He competed in various swimming disciplines at the Summer Olympics of 1972, 1976 and 1980, but never reached the finals. On January 25, 2017 he was appointed to be the head coach of the swimming team of Hungary.

References

1957 births
Living people
Swimmers at the 1972 Summer Olympics
Swimmers at the 1976 Summer Olympics
Swimmers at the 1980 Summer Olympics
Olympic swimmers of Hungary
Hungarian male swimmers
European Aquatics Championships medalists in swimming
Sportspeople from Eger